Soa is a genus of scaly-winged barklice in the family Lepidopsocidae. There are about six described species in Soa.

Species
These six species belong to the genus Soa:
 Soa angolana Badonnel, 1955 c g
 Soa dahliana Enderlein, 1904 c g
 Soa enderleini New, 1977 c g
 Soa flaviterminata Enderlein, 1906 i c g
 Soa reticulata Thornton & A. K. T. Woo, 1973 c g
 Soa violacea New, 1975 c g
Data sources: i = ITIS, c = Catalogue of Life, g = GBIF, b = Bugguide.net

References

Further reading

 
 
 

Trogiomorpha